Banket (bahn-KET) is a type of sweet pastry filled with almond paste, which originated in the Netherlands. It is made in several forms, each of which go by various names. It is sometimes made as individual banket or almond patties.

Banket is made by rolling pastry dough around an almond paste filling, then baking it. The pastry has a porous, airy, and flaky texture, with a dense granular filling.

In the Netherlands and in ethnic Dutch communities in the Midwestern United States, it is most popular during Christmas season. It is also popular during Dutch festivals in the United States.

Ingredients and preparation 

Banket is typically prepared using a mixture of flour, eggs, and butter, or puff pastry as its base, then filled with almond paste, and dusted with sugar. Marzipan, an almond paste prepared with almond meal and honey or sugar, is sometimes used as the filling. Although usually prepared and sold fresh, it can also be packaged for retail sale.

In one popular form, banket is rolled or folded into a log a foot or two long, baked, then cut into short lengths for serving, hot or cold. It can also be frozen for serving later. It is sometimes prepared as a cookie. The "Dutch letter" is rolled and shaped into a letter. Traditionally, the pastry was shaped into the initial of the family's surname, but today is most commonly shaped as the letter S.

History

Netherlands 
In the Netherlands banketletter are traditionally eaten on Sinterklaasavond on December 5.

United States 
Banket was introduced in the United States by Dutch immigrants, in Pella, Iowa, Orange City, Iowa, and Holland, Michigan, each founded in the 1800s by "Dutch religious refugees". Dutch letters are a common treat at the annual Tulip Festival in Pella, and may be prepared by local residents and sold at local churches.

See also 

 Chocolate letter
 Dutch cuisine
 List of cookies
 List of pastries

References

Further reading
 

Christmas food
Cuisine of the Midwestern United States
Sinterklaas food
Dutch pastries
Almond desserts